The 2014 Mountain West Conference football season was 16th season of college football for the Mountain West Conference (MW). In the 2014 NCAA Division I FBS football season, the MW had 12 football members: Air Force, Boise State, Colorado State, Fresno State, Hawaiʻi, Nevada, New Mexico, San Diego State, San Jose State, UNLV, Utah State, and Wyoming.

This was the first time in four years that the membership of the MW did not change. Initially, UNLV was ineligible for postseason play due to their failure to meet Academic Progress Rate (APR) guidelines. However, the NCAA later accepted an updated APR report from UNLV, showing that the school had met guidelines, and lifted the ban.

Rankings

Schedule
A schedule for the season can be viewed here.

Championship game

The championship game will be played on December 6, 2014. It will feature the highest ranked teams from two division championships.

References